The Women's pentathlon event  at the 2005 European Athletics Indoor Championships was held on March 4.

Medalists

Results

60 metres hurdles

High jump

Shot put

Long jump

800 metres

Final results

References
Results

Combined events at the European Athletics Indoor Championships
Pentathlon
2005 in women's athletics